Constellation Field is a baseball park located in Sugar Land, Texas.  It is the home of the Sugar Land Space Cowboys of the Pacific Coast League, who began play in 2012 as the Sugar Land Skeeters. The park also has the ability to host rugby union, American football, soccer, lacrosse, and cheerleading competitions, as well as concerts. Constellation Field has a capacity of 7,500 spectators for baseball games, and 9,500 spectators for concerts.

History
In December 2010, StarTex Power—a Houston-based power company—bought the naming rights for the ballpark from the team and the City of Sugar Land. In December 2011, the ballpark's name was changed to Constellation Field after the merger of StarTex Power and Constellation Energy.

Constellation Field opened on April 26, 2012 when the Sugar Land Skeeters hosted the York Revolution.

Concerts
The ballpark has held various concerts in its history.  On October 19, 2012, REO Speedwagon and Night Ranger used Constellation Field as a venue, and the following day ZZ Top and Kenny Wayne Shepherd did the same.

On October 9, 2015, Constellation Field hosted "Country at the Ballpark" with Chris Young, Eli Young Band, and Cassadee Pope.

College baseball
Constellation Field hosted the 2013, 2015, and 2016 Southland Conference baseball tournament.

Constellation Field is also an annual neutral site for a regular season game of the Silver Glove series between the Houston Cougars and Rice Owls. The Cougars lead the all-time series 3–0 over the Owls at Constellation Field.

Rugby
In 2018, the Houston SaberCats of Major League Rugby utilized the ballpark for exhibition games of the upstart league. They later played their regular season home games at Dyer Stadium. For the 2019 season, the club anticipated having a dedicated rugby stadium for their use, Aveva Stadium, to be completed in time for the first home game. Due to construction delays caused by weather, the SaberCats continued play at Constellation Field for the beginning of their season. They are expected to open their first home game at Aveva Stadium in April 2019.

Acquisition by the Houston Astros
On April 20, 2021, the Sugar Land City Council approved the acquisition of the Sugar Land Skeeters by the Houston Astros, as well as extended the Skeeters' Constellation Field lease until 2045.

Features
Constellation Field has one of the largest scoreboards in minor league baseball.  It is also unique in that its shape resembles Texas' borders.  The scoreboard, constructed by TS Sports, rises almost 100 feet above the playing field.  Additionally, Constellation Field has a traditional, manually operated scoreboard in the left-field wall.

References
 

Baseball venues in Texas
College baseball venues in the United States
Lacrosse venues in the United States
Rugby union stadiums in Houston
Houston SaberCats
Houston SaberCats stadiums
Sugar Land, Texas
Sports venues completed in 2012
Minor league baseball venues
Southland Conference Baseball Tournament venues
Pacific Coast League ballparks